Alder Bed Mountain is a summit located in Central New York Region of New York located in the Town of Webb in Herkimer County, north-northwest of Stillwater Reservoir. Maple Hill is located northwest and The Hogs Back is located west-southwest of Alder Bed Mountain.

References

Mountains of Herkimer County, New York
Mountains of New York (state)